Asaia  is a genus of Gram-negative, aerobic and rod-shaped bacteria from the family of Acetobacteraceae which occur in tropical plants.
Asaia might be able to control malaria by massively colonizing the midgut and the male reproductive system of the mosquito Anopheles stephensi

References

Further reading 
 
 
 
 
 
 
 

Rhodospirillales
Bacteria genera